Mishino is a rural locality (a village) in Kovarditskoye Rural Settlement, Muromsky District, Vladimir Oblast, Russia. The population was 217 as of 2010. There are 4 streets.

Geography 
Mishino is located on the Ilevna River, 12 km south of Murom (the district's administrative centre) by road. Zagryazhskoye is the nearest rural locality.

References 

Rural localities in Muromsky District